Anatoly Mikhaylovich Khrapaty (also Chrapaty, ; 20 October 1962 – 11 August 2008) was a heavyweight weightlifter, Olympic Champion, and five time World Champion who competed for the Soviet Union and Kazakhstan. Between 1984 and 1996 he won a gold and a silver Olympic medal, as well as five worlds and five European titles. He also set five world records: one in the snatch, three in the clean and jerk and one in the total.

Khrapaty retired after the 2000 Olympic Games to become a Kazakhstan national coach. He died at age 45, a few days before his flight to the 2008 Summer Olympics, when his motorcycle was hit by an oncoming vehicle.

Major results

References 

1962 births
2008 deaths
Soviet male weightlifters
Kazakhstani male weightlifters
Kazakhstani people of Russian descent
Weightlifters at the 1988 Summer Olympics
Weightlifters at the 1996 Summer Olympics
Weightlifters at the 2000 Summer Olympics
Olympic weightlifters of the Soviet Union
Olympic gold medalists for the Soviet Union
Olympic weightlifters of Kazakhstan
Olympic silver medalists for Kazakhstan
Road incident deaths in Kazakhstan
Motorcycle road incident deaths
Olympic medalists in weightlifting
Asian Games medalists in weightlifting
Weightlifters at the 1994 Asian Games
Weightlifters at the 1998 Asian Games
Medalists at the 1996 Summer Olympics
Medalists at the 1988 Summer Olympics
Asian Games silver medalists for Kazakhstan
Medalists at the 1994 Asian Games
Medalists at the 1998 Asian Games
European Weightlifting Championships medalists
World Weightlifting Championships medalists